Steven Katz (born October 8, 1959) is an American writer best known for his work on Shadow of the Vampire.  He received a B. A. in English and Art History from Brown University in 1982 and an M. A. in English from Columbia University in 1984.  He currently lives in New York City.

Screenplays
1992-1994 Fallen Angels writer of episodes Since I Don't Have You and Tomorrow I Die .
1996  From the Earth to the Moon writer of episode Can We Do This? .
2000 Shadow of the Vampire
2007 Wind Chill (with Joseph Gangemi).
2014-15 The Knick Supervising producer, Co-executive producer, writer of episodes "They Capture the Heat", "The Golden Lotus", "Whiplash" and "Not Well At All".
2017  Manhunt: Unabomber  Co-executive producer, writer of episode 5, "Abri".

Other works
2002 Walton Ford: Tigers of Wrath, Horses of Instruction monograph about the New York-born artist Walton Ford

Awards
2000 Bram Stoker Award for Best Screenwriter for Shadow of the Vampire.

References

External links

American male screenwriters
Columbia Graduate School of Arts and Sciences alumni
Brown University alumni
1959 births
Living people
Writers from St. Louis
Screenwriters from Missouri